The Livonian language ( or ) is a Finnic language whose native land is the Livonian Coast of the Gulf of Livonia, located in the north of the Kurzeme peninsula in Latvia. Although its last native speaker died in 2013, there are about 40 reported L2 speakers and 210 having reported some knowledge of the language. Possibly uniquely among the Uralic languages, Livonian has been described as a pitch-accent language (see below).
 
Currently, the only person whose native language is Livonian is Kuldi Medne who was born in 2020. Her parents are Livonian language revival activists Jānis Mednis and Renāte Medne. Some ethnic Livonians are learning or have learned Livonian in an attempt to revive it, but because ethnic Livonians are a small minority, opportunities to use Livonian are limited. The Estonian newspaper Eesti Päevaleht erroneously announced that Viktors Bertholds, who died on 28 February 2009, was the last native speaker who started Latvian-language school as a monolingual. Some other Livonians had argued, however, that there were some native speakers left, including Viktors Bertholds' cousin, Grizelda Kristiņa, who died in 2013. An article published by the Foundation for Endangered Languages in 2007 stated that there were only 182 registered Livonians and a mere six native speakers. In a 2009 conference proceeding, it was mentioned that there could be "at best 10 living native" speakers of the language.

The promotion of the Livonian language as a living language has been advanced mostly by the Livonian Cultural Centre, an organisation of mostly young Livonians. Livonian as a lesser used language in Latvia – along with Latgalian – is represented by the Latvian Bureau of Lesser Used Languages (LatBLUL), formerly a national branch of the European Bureau of Lesser Used Languages (EBLUL).

The language is taught in universities in Latvia, Estonia, Finland and Sweden, which constantly increases the pool of people with some knowledge of the language who do not permanently reside in Latvia.

History 

In the 19th century, about 2,000 people still spoke Livonian; in 1852, the number of Livonians was 2,394. Various historical events have led to the near total language death of Livonian:
 In the 13th century, speakers of Livonian numbered 30,000.
 The German invasion: around the year 1200, the Livonian Brothers of the Sword and the Teutonic knights conquered Livonia, leading to contention of rule of the area between these orders and the Archbishopric of Riga.
 1522: The introduction of the Protestant Reformation. 
 1557: The Russian invasion, also known as the Russo-Swedish War.
 1558–1583: Livonian War. Russians, Swedes, Danes, Lithuanians and Poles fought over the area.
 1721: The Treaty of Nystad. Northern Livonia became provinces of Tsarist Russia.
 1918: The founding of Latvia; the Livonian language re-blossomed.
 World War II and Soviet Union: marginalisation of Livonian.
 Declared extinct on 6 June 2013.
Revival of the Livonian language started after the last native speaker died.

In the 13th century, the native Livonians inhabited the Estonian counties Alempois, Jogentagana Järva, Läänemaa, Mõhu, Nurmekund, Sakala, Ugandi, and Vaiga in the north, and by the Daugava in the south . The Livonian settlement of Curonia was also begun then. In the 12th–13th centuries the Livonian lands were conquered by the Teutonic Order. The conquest led to a strong decrease in the number of speakers of the Livonian language, empty Livonian lands inhabited by the Latvians, which contributed to the replacement of the Livonian language in favor of Latvian. It is estimated that at the time of the German colonization, there were 30,000 Livonians. In the 19th century the number of speakers of the Couronian dialect is estimated as follows: 2,074 people in 1835, 2,324 people in 1852, 2,390 people in 1858, 2,929 people in 1888. According to the Soviet Census of 1989, 226 people were Livonian, and almost half of them spoke Livonian. According to estimates of the Liv Culture Center in 2010, only 40 people spoke Livonian in everyday life. In 2013, there were none who spoke Livonian in everyday life.

Early literature
The first Livonian words were recorded in the Livonian Chronicle of Henry. The first written sources about Livonian appeared in the 16th century. The collection of Livonian poems "Mariners sacred songs and prayers" was translated to Latvian by Jānis Prints and his son Jānis Jr. and was published in 1845. The first book in Livonian was the Gospel of Matthew, published in 1863 in London in both the eastern and western Courland dialects. It was translated into eastern Couronian by Nick Pollmann and into western Couronian by Jānis Prints and Peteris. The plan with the book was to establish a standard orthography by F. Wiedemann, which consisted of 36 letters with many diacritics. The total circulation was 250 copies. The Livonians received only one copy of each dialect. The second book in Livonian was the same Gospel of Matthew, published in 1880 in St. Petersburg, with an orthography based on Latvian and German.

In the interwar period, there were several dozen books published in Livonian, mainly with the help of Finnish and Estonian organizations. In 1930, the first newspaper in Livonian, "Līvli", was published. In 1942, a translation of the New Testament was published in Helsinki. It was translated by Kōrli Stalte, with help from the Finnish linguist Lauri Kettunen. After WWII, books in Livonian were no longer published, as Latvia was occupied by the Soviet Union. The whole area of the Livonian Coast became a restricted border zone under tight Soviet supervision. Coastal fishing was gradually eliminated in the smaller villages and concentrated in the larger population centres of Kolka, Roja, and Ventspils. Limits were placed on freedom of movement for inhabitants. All of these factors contributed to the decline of the language, although some initiatives appeared from the early 1970s onwards.

After Latvia regained its independence, the newsletter "Õvā" was published in Livonian in 1994, dedicated to the Livonian culture, art, and figures of the national movement, and in 1998 with the support of the "Open Society," the first collection of poetry in Livonian, "Ma akūb sīnda vizzõ, tūrska!", was published and presented in Finland and Estonia.  It combines the works of famous Livonian poets. To date, the only Livonian media outlet is the trilingual (English-Latvian-Livonian) Livones.lv (livones.net) operated by the Liv Culture Center.

Two sites were included in the Atlas Linguarum Europae to study Livonian: Miķeļtornis and Mazirbe.

Speakers of Livonian in the twenty-first century

Viktors Bertholds (10 July 1921 – 28 February 2009), one of the last Livonian speakers of the generation who learnt Livonian as a first language in a Livonian-speaking family and community, died on 28 February 2009. Though it was reported that he was the last native speaker of the language, Livonians themselves claimed that there were more native speakers still alive, albeit very few.

As reported in the Estonian newspaper Eesti Päevaleht, Viktors Bertholds was born in 1921 and probably belonged to the last generation of children who started their (Latvian-medium) primary school as Livonian monolinguals; only a few years later it was noted that Livonian parents had begun to speak Latvian with their children. During World War II, Bertholds, unlike most Livonian men, managed to avoid being mobilized in the armies of either occupation force by hiding in the woods. After the war, Bertholds worked in various professions and shared his knowledge of the Livonian language with many field linguists; in the 1990s, he also taught Livonian in children's summer camps.

Bertholds' Livonian-speaking brother and wife died in the 1990s. In the early 2000s, many other prominent "last Livonians" also died, such as Poulin Klavin (1918–2001), keeper of many Livonian traditions and the last Livonian to reside permanently on the Courland coast, and Edgar Vaalgamaa (1912–2003), clergyman in Finland, translator of the New Testament and author of a book on the history and culture of the Livonians.

The last native speaker of Livonian was Grizelda Kristiņa, née Bertholde (1910–2013, a cousin of Viktors Bertholds), who lived in Canada from 1949. According to Valts Ernštreits, she spoke Livonian as well "as if she had stepped out of her home farm in a Livonian coastal village just yesterday". and qualified as the last living native speaker of the Livonian language of her generation. She died on June 2, 2013.

The survival of the Livonian language now depends on young Livonians who learnt Livonian in their childhood from grandparents or great-grandparents of the pre-war generations. There are not many of them, though there are a few hundred ethnic Livonians in Latvia now who are interested in their Livonian roots. Some young Livonians not only sing folk-songs in Livonian but even strive to use Livonian actively in everyday communication. In 2018, the Livonian Institute at the University of Latvia was established to promote research and awareness of the language.

Phonology
Livonian, like Estonian, has lost vowel harmony, but unlike Estonian, it has also lost consonant gradation.

Vowels
Livonian has 8 vowels in the table below. Additionally two archaic vowels are given in parentheses:

All vowels can be long or short. Short vowels are written as indicated in the table; long vowels are written with an additional macron ("ˉ") over the letter, so, for example,  = . The Livonian vowel system is notable for having a stød similar to Danish. As in other languages with this feature, it is thought to be a vestige of an earlier pitch accent.

Livonian has also a large number of diphthongs, as well as a number of triphthongs. These can also occur as short or long.

The same applies to the triphthongs uoi : ūoi.

Consonants
Livonian has 23 consonants:

 are restricted to loans, except for some interjections containing . Voiced obstruents are subject to being either devoiced or half-voiced in the word-final position, or before another unvoiced consonants (kuolmõz  "third").

Alphabet 
The Livonian alphabet is a hybrid which mixes Latvian and Estonian orthography.

Grammar

Language contacts with Latvians and Estonians
Livonian has for centuries been thoroughly influenced by Latvian in terms of grammar, phonology and word derivation etc. The dative case in Livonian, for example, is very unusual for a Finnic language. There are about 2,000 Latvian and 200 Low Saxon and German loanwords in Livonian and most of the Germanic loanwords were adopted through Latvian. Latvian, however, was influenced by Livonian as well. Its regular syllable stress, which is based on Livonian, is very unusual in a Baltic language.  Especially as of the end of the nineteenth century there was a great deal of contact with Estonians, namely between (Kurzeme) Livonian fishers or mariners and the Estonians from Saaremaa or other islands.  Many inhabitants of the islands of Western Estonia worked in the summer in Kurzeme Livonian villages.  As a result, a knowledge of Estonian spread among those Livonians and words of Estonian origin also came into Livonian. There are about 800 Estonian loanwords in Livonian, most of which were borrowed from the Saaremaa dialect.

Common phrases
 Hello! – 
 Enjoy your meal! – 
 Good morning! – 
 Good day! – 
 Good night! – 
 Thank you! – 
 Happy new year! – 
 one – 
 two – 
 three – 
 four – 
 five – 
 six – 
 seven – 
 eight – 
 nine – 
 ten –

See also 
  – the national anthem of the Livonians
 Tuļļi Lum – Livonian-Estonian world music group

References

Bibliography

 
 
 Kettunen, Lauri (1938). Livisches Wörterbuch: mit grammatischer Einleitung. Helsinki: Finno-Ugrian Society. 
 
 
 de Sivers, Fanny (2001). Parlons live – Une langue de la Baltique. Paris: L'Harmattan. .

Further reading 
 . "Development, Research and Sources of Written Livonian". In: Linguistica Uralica 48, nr. 1 (2012). pp. 55-67. DOI: 10.3176/lu.2012.1.05.
 . "Livonian at the crossroads of language contacts". In: Santeri Junttila (ed.). Contacts between the Baltic and Finnic languages. Uralica Helsingiensia 7. Helsinki: 2015. pp. 97-150. ; .
 .

External links 

Livones.lv
Virtual Livonia
Latvian–Livonian–English Phrase Book
 Livonian language resources at Giellatekno
 Livonian – Latvian/Estonian/Finnish dictionary (robust finite-state, open-source)

 
Finnic languages
Languages of Latvia
Extinct languages of Europe
Languages extinct in the 2010s